The National Beach Soccer Championship, officially known as the Hero National Beach Soccer Championship due to sponsorship ties with Hero MotoCorp, is an annual Beach soccer tournament in India, organised by the All India Football Federation (AIFF)

Seasons 
The following is the list of winners and runners-up from every edition of the National Beach Soccer Championship.

See also 
Football in India
Sport in India
Futsal Club Championship
AFC Beach Soccer Asian Cup

References

External links
 

Beach soccer in India
National beach soccer competitions
2023 establishments in India
Recurring sporting events established in 2023